Jonathan English is a British filmmaker who has written, directed, and produced several films.

He is known for Minotaur (2006), Ironclad (2011) and Ironclad: Battle for Blood (2014).

Career
English co-founded Mythic International Entertainment, the production company of his newest film Ironclad along with Rick Benattar (producer of Shoot 'Em Up) and Andrew Curtis.  He previously directed Minotaur and Nailing Vienna.

References

External links
 
 Jonathan English website biography

Living people
Year of birth missing (living people)
English film directors
English film producers
English screenwriters
English male screenwriters
English-language film directors
Alumni of Arts University Bournemouth